Guri i Kuq Lake (Jezero Žuti kamen, literally: "Yellow Stone Lake") is a lake in Kosovo, located on the Žuti kamen mountain, in the Prokletije range. It is one of the largest lakes in the Kosovan part of the range after Gjeravica Lake and Liqenat Lake. Unlike Liqenat Lake, the Žuti kamen lake is not surrounded by trees but instead by large meadows. Just north of the lake is the Rugova Canyon.

See also 
Guri i Kuq

Notes

References 

Lakes of Kosovo
Accursed Mountains